Jan Tomasz Drohojowski from Drohojów (b. 1535, d.. 12 November 1605 in Przemyśl) was a Polish nobleman, referendarz wielki koronny, starosta of Przemyśl, a Polish ambassador in Istanbul in 1578, an owner of the castle in Rybotycze.

Bibliography 
 Polski Słownik Biograficzny (t. 5, s. 382)

Further reading 
 Drohojowski Jan, Kronika Drohojowskich, Vol. 1, Kraków 1904.

1535 births
1605 deaths
16th-century Polish nobility
17th-century Polish nobility
16th-century Polish landowners